Juan Acuña Naya, (14 February 1923 – 30 August 2001) was a Spanish football goalkeeper who spent most of his playing career with Deportivo de La Coruña.

Biography 

Born in A Coruña, he started his career with Sporting Coruñés. Naya then went on to play for Eureka before joining Deportivo de la Coruña in 1938 with whom he would play until 1955. He played his first game with Deportivo in Ferroll in 1938. The following year, he signed a new contract with Deportivo with a salary of 300 pesetas per month.

He suffered many problems because of injuries and being overweight. He is the goalkeeper with second-most Zamora Trophies with four, behind Antoni Ramallets with five wins.

In 1961, he was offered a tribute match between Deportivo and CD Ourense. In 1990 Deportivo created a Trophy with his name.

Honours
Individual
Zamora Trophy: 1941–42, 1942–43, 1949–50, 1950–51

References

External links
 

1923 births
Spanish footballers
Spain international footballers
Association football goalkeepers
Deportivo de La Coruña players
La Liga players
1950 FIFA World Cup players
Footballers from A Coruña
2001 deaths